Porpoise class submarine can refer to:

 Grampus-class submarine, six British submarines launched in the 1930s, sometimes called the Porpoise class
 British Porpoise-class submarine, eight submarines launched in the 1950s
 United States Porpoise-class submarine, ten submarines launched in the 1930s